King Lysen (March 10, 1942 – March 15, 2017) was an American educator and politician in the state of Washington. He served in the Washington House of Representatives and Washington State Senate as a Democrat.

References

2017 deaths
1942 births
Politicians from Minneapolis
Democratic Party Washington (state) state senators
Democratic Party members of the Washington House of Representatives